Antonia Tucaković (née Jukić; born 9 May 1992) is a Croatian handball player who plays for RK Podravka Koprivnica and the Croatia national team.

References
 

      
1992 births
Living people
Sportspeople from Split, Croatia
Croatian female handball players
RK Podravka Koprivnica players
Competitors at the 2022 Mediterranean Games
Mediterranean Games silver medalists for Croatia
Mediterranean Games medalists in handball